The Lytham Academy of Theatre Arts (LATA) is a British theatre group located in Lytham, Lancashire.

The Lytham Academy of Theatre Arts formed in 1994 is a society open to anyone aged 10–18 years old. They perform shows every November in the main theatre of Lytham, Lowther Pavilion.

Productions performed by LATA have included The Vackees, Half a Sixpence, Dracula Spectacula, Barnum, West Side Story, Pendragon, Oklahoma!, Me and My Girl, Copacabana, Oliver!, and Meet Me in St. Louis. Their most recent production of Les Misérables is their most successful show to date, with all 5 performances sold out, and standing ovations after each. They also reportedly broke all box office records at the Pavilion with the show, and had the highest selling matinée performance there, ever.

The society is associated with NODA (National Operatic and Dramatic Association), from whom LATA have won many awards for individual and group performances. They have won the Best Overall Youth Production award twice, for Barnum and West Side Story.

The group began as a youth section of the group Lytham Amateur Operatic Society (LAOS) but recently LATA became a separate entity. Many of LATA's past members have gone on to drama schools and stage productions all over the country.

Past Productions 
 1994 – The Rock and Roll Years
 1995 – The Vackees
 1996 – Half a Sixpence
 1997 – Spirit of the Stage
 1998 – Dazzle
 1999 – Dracula Spectacular
 2000 – Barnum
 2001 – West Side Story
 2002 – Pendragon
 2003 – Oklahoma
 2004 – Me and My Girl
 2005 – Copacabana
 2006 – Oliver
 2007 – Meet Me in St. Louis
 2008 – Seussical
 2009 – Thoroughly Modern Millie
 2010 – Les Misérables
 2011–  "Our House"
 2012-  "Beauty And The Beast"

References

External links
 LATA website

Amateur theatre companies in England
Lytham St Annes